Aphytoceros is a genus of moths of the family Crambidae.

Species
Aphytoceros hollandiae Munroe, 1968
Aphytoceros lucusalis (Walker, 1859)
Aphytoceros subflavalis Swinhoe, 1917

References

Spilomelinae
Crambidae genera
Taxa named by Edward Meyrick